Zbrosławice  (1936–1945: Dramatal-West) is a village in Tarnowskie Góry County, Silesian Voivodeship, in southern Poland. It is the seat of the gmina (administrative district) called Gmina Zbrosławice.

The village has a population of 2,338.

People
The librarian Barbara Lison was born here in 1956.

References

Villages in Tarnowskie Góry County